This page is a list of individuals and organisations who have endorsed parties or individual candidates for the 2018 Malaysian general election.

Endorsements for parties

Individuals

Barisan Nasional 
 Abdullah Ahmad Badawi, politician and former prime minister
 Jamal Abdillah, singer and actor
 Azwan Ali, actor and television host
 Zizan Razak, comedian, actor and singer
 Rosyam Nor, actor, television host and film producer
 Fattah Amin, actor and singer
 Shaheizy Sam, actor and singer

Pakatan Harapan 
 Ahmed Mahloof, Maldivian MP
 Kimberley Motley, American attorney
 Siti Nurhaliza, singer and businesswoman
 Sheila Majid, singer
 Rozita Che Wan, actor and comedian
 Adibah Noor, singer and actress
 Daphne Iking, television host and actress
 Nur Fathia, actress and model
 Afdlin Shauki, actor and comedian
 Sharnaaz Ahmad, actor
 Hairul Azreen, martial artist, actor and stuntman 
 Ummi Hafilda Ali, businesswoman
 Rafidah Aziz, politician
 Daim Zainuddin, politician and businessman
 Rais Yatim, politician and lawyer
 Abby Abadi, singer and actress
 Ambiga Sreenevasan, lawyer and human rights advocate
 Maria Chin Abdullah, activist
 Abdul Samad Said, laureate, novelist and poet
 Wan Aishah, singer
 Wardina Safiyyah, actress, model and television host
 Yasin Sulaiman, singer
 Yeop Adlan Che Rose, former diplomat
 Redzuawan Ismail aka Chef Wan, celebrity chef, television host, actor and restaurateur.

Parti Islam Se-Malaysia 
 Muhamad Radhi Mat Din, football coach and former footballer
 Raja Petra Kamarudin, blogger and editor

Organisations

Pakatan Harapan 
 Hindu Rights Action Force
 Bersih
 Catholic Bishops' Conference of Malaysia, Singapore and Brunei
 Malaysian Trades Union Congress

Parties 
Some parties which only contest elections in certain parts of Malaysia have endorsed political parties in areas they don't contest.

Pakatan Harapan 
 Socialist Party of Malaysia
 Sabah Heritage Party
 Minority Rights Action Party

Sabah Heritage Party 
 Pakatan Harapan

References

2018 Malaysian general election
Political endorsements